Vibberodden Lighthouse is a harbour lighthouse located in the municipality of Eigersund in Rogaland county, Norway. It was first lit in 1855, and automated in 1977. The lighthouse is located on the small island of Vibberodden, just southeast of the shore of the island of Eigerøya, marking the west side of the entrance to a narrow fjord leading to the town of Egersund.  The lighthouse operates in coordination with Eigerøy Lighthouse and guides boats into the southern entrance to the Egersund harbour.

The current light was built in 1977, although the lighthouse station was established 1855. The white, red, or green light (depending on direction) is an occulting light which flashes off once every 6 seconds at an intensity of 4,500 candela. The lighthouse is painted white and the lantern roof is painted red. The present light is located adjacent to the old lighthouse. The site is open to visitors, but the tower is closed.

History
The lighthouse on Vibberodden was first established in 1855. The original lighthouse was decommissioned in 1977 when a new automated light was built right next to the old building. The tower is right in front of a 1-1/2 story wood lighthouse keeper's house. The building is painted white and the lantern and gallery is red. In 2006, the lighthouse was leased to a new foundation established by the Egersund Coastal Society, Nordfjord Folk Museum, and the municipality of Eigersund. The foundation has begun the historic restoration of the building, and work is continuing.

See also

 List of lighthouses in Norway
 Lighthouses in Norway

References

External links
 Norsk Fyrhistorisk Forening 
 Picture of Vibberodden Lighthouse

Lighthouses completed in 1855
Eigersund
Lighthouses in Rogaland